The 2012 Canadian Open of Curling was held from December 12 to 16 at Prospera Place in Kelowna, British Columbia as part of the 2012–13 World Curling Tour. The event was the second men's Grand Slam event of the season. The event was held in a round robin format, and the purse for the event was CAD$100,000. In the final, Glenn Howard won his second Canadian Open title and his eleventh Grand Slam title with a win over Brad Jacobs, clinching the victory with a score of 3–1 after a steal in the final end.

Teams
The teams are listed as follows:

Round robin standings
Final Round Robin Standings

Round robin results
All draw times listed in Pacific Standard Time (UTC−8).

Draw 1
Wednesday, December 12, 7:00 pm

Draw 2
Thursday, December 13, 9:00 am

Draw 3
Thursday, December 13, 12:30 pm

Draw 4
Thursday, December 13, 4:30 pm

Draw 5
Thursday, December 13, 8:00 pm

Draw 6
Friday, December 14, 9:00 am

Draw 7
Friday, December 14, 12:30 pm

Draw 8
Friday, December 14, 4:00 pm

Draw 9
Friday, December 14, 8:00 pm

Tiebreakers
Saturday, December 15, 9:00 am

Playoffs

Quarterfinals
Saturday, December 15, 12:30 pm

Semifinals
Saturday, December 15, 4:30 pm

Final
Sunday, December 16, 10:00 am

Notes

References

External links

2012
2012 in Canadian curling
Sport in Kelowna
Curling in British Columbia